The Oslo Cup is a Group 3 flat horse race in Norway open to thoroughbreds aged three years or older. It is run over a distance of 2,400 metres (about 1½ miles) at Øvrevoll in late July or early August. It was changed from the Walter Nilsens Minneløp in 2013.

History
The event was named Walter Nilsens Minneløp 2005-2012 in memory of Walter Nilsen, a successful owner-breeder in Norway. It was established in 2005, and was initially held on May 17, the Norwegian public holiday of Constitution Day. It replaced the Oslo Cup, originally staged later in the season.

The Walter Nilsens Minneløp was originally restricted to horses aged four or older. The first running was won by the previous year's Oslo Cup winner, Alpino Chileno.

The race was given Listed status in 2007. It was promoted to Group 3 level in 2011. It was moved to July and opened to three-year-olds in 2012.

Records
Most successful horse (2 wins):
 Appel au Maitre – 2008, 2009

Leading jockey (4 wins):
 Fredrik Johansson – Appel au Maitre (2008, 2009), Bank of Burden (2011), Sir Lando (2012)

Leading trainer (7 wins):
 Niels Petersen - Bank of Burden (2011), Without Fear (2014), Eye In The Sky (2015), Our Last Summer (2018), Square de Luynes (2019), Privilegiado (2020), Wishformore (2021)

Winners

 Eye In The Sky finished first in 2017 but was placed third for causing interference.

Oslo Cup
The Oslo Cup was the precursor of the Walter Nilsens Minneløp. It was last run in 2004.

 1953: Stratos
 1956: Norse
 1957: Cobetto
 1958: Orsini
 1963: Briansk
 1972: Gunsmoke
 1975: Noble Dancer
 1976: Noble Dancer
 1977: Brave Tudor
 1978: Hill's Double
 1979: Coulstry
 1982: Rheinsteel
 1983: Shaftesbury
 1984: Rheinsteel
 1985: Tryffoc
 1986: Sand Ship
 1987: Gulfland
 1988: Sunset Boulevard
 1990: Feuerbach
 1991: Silvestro
 1992: Red Hero
 1993: Kateb
 1994: Kateb
 1995: Theatrician
 1996: Ballet Prince / Laila Alawi *
 1997: Inchrory
 1998: Inchrory
 1999: Inchrory
 2000: Royal Crusade
 2001: Valley Chapel
 2002: Parthe
 2003: Sagittarius
 2004: Alpino Chileno

* The 1996 race was a dead-heat and has joint winners.

See also
 List of Scandinavian flat horse races

References

 Racing Post:
 galopp-sieger.de – Oslo Cup.
 galopp-sieger.de – Walter Nilsens Minneløp.
 horseracingintfed.com – International Federation of Horseracing Authorities – Oslo Cup (2018).
 ovrevoll.no – Oslo Cup / Walter Nilsens Minneløp.
 pedigreequery.com – Oslo Cup – Øvrevoll.
 pedigreequery.com – Walter Nilsens Minneløp – Øvrevoll.

Open middle distance horse races
Sport in Bærum
Horse races in Norway
2005 establishments in Norway
Recurring sporting events established in 2005
Summer events in Norway